Aromatase, also called estrogen synthetase or estrogen synthase, is an enzyme responsible for a key step in the biosynthesis of estrogens. It is CYP19A1, a member of the cytochrome P450 superfamily, which are monooxygenases that catalyze many reactions involved in steroidogenesis. In particular, aromatase is responsible for the aromatization of androgens into estrogens. The enzyme aromatase can be found in many tissues including gonads (granulosa cells), brain, adipose tissue, placenta, blood vessels, skin, and bone, as well as in tissue of endometriosis, uterine fibroids, breast cancer, and endometrial cancer. It is an important factor in sexual development.

Function 
Aromatase is localized in the endoplasmic reticulum where it is regulated by tissue-specific promoters that are in turn controlled by hormones, cytokines, and other factors. It catalyzes the last steps of estrogen biosynthesis from androgens (specifically, it transforms androstenedione to estrone and testosterone to estradiol). These steps include three successive hydroxylations of the 19-methyl group of androgens, followed by simultaneous elimination of the methyl group as formate and aromatization of the A-ring.

Androstenedione + 3O2 + 3NADPH + 3H+  Estrone + Formate + 4H2O + 3NADP+
Testosterone + 3O2 + 3NADPH + 3H+  17β-estradiol + Formate + 4H2O + 3NADP+

Expression
Aromatase is expressed in the gonads, placenta, brain, adipose tissue, bone, and other tissues. It is almost undetectable in adult human liver.

Genomics
The gene expresses two transcript variants. In humans, the gene CYP19, located on chromosome 15q21.1, encodes aromatase. The gene has nine coding exons and a number of alternative non-coding first exons that regulate tissue specific expression.

CYP19 is present in an early-diverging chordate, the cephalochordate amphioxus (the Florida lancelet, Branchiostoma floridae), but not in the earlier diverging tunicate Ciona intestinalis. Thus, the aromatase gene evolved early in chordate evolution and does not appear to be present in nonchordate invertebrates (e.g. insects, molluscs, echinoderms, sponges, corals). However, estrogens may be synthesized in some of these organisms, via other unknown pathways.

Activity 
Aromatase activity is increased by age, obesity, insulin, gonadotropins, and alcohol. It also appears to be enhanced in certain estrogen-dependent local tissue next to breast tissue, endometrial cancer, endometriosis, and uterine fibroids.

Aromatase activity is decreased or antagonized by prolactin, anti-Müllerian hormone and glyphosate.

Role in sex-determination 
Aromatase is generally highly present during the differentiation of ovaries.  It is also susceptible to environmental influences, particularly temperature.  In species with temperature-dependent sex determination, aromatase is expressed in higher quantities at temperatures that yield female offspring.  Despite the fact that data suggest temperature controls aromatase quantities, other studies have shown that aromatase can overpower the effects of temperature: if exposed to more aromatase at a male-producing temperature, the organism will develop female and conversely, if exposed to less aromatase at female-producing temperatures, the organism will develop male (see sex reversal).  In organisms that develop through genetic sex determination, temperature does not affect aromatase expression and function, suggesting that aromatase is the target molecule for temperature during TSD (for challenges to this argument, see temperature-dependent sex determination).  It varies from species to species whether it is the aromatase protein that has different activity at different temperatures or whether the amount of transcription undergone by the aromatase gene is what is temperature-sensitive, but in either case, differential development is observed at different temperatures.

Role in neuroprotection 
Aromatase in the brain is usually only expressed in neurons. However, following penetrative brain injury of both mice and zebra finches, it has been shown to be expressed in astrocytes. It has also been shown to decrease apoptosis following brain injury in zebra finches. This is thought to be due to the neuroprotective actions of estrogens, including estradiol. Research has found that two pro-inflammatory cytokines, interleukin-1β (IL-1β) and interleukin-6 (IL-6), are responsible for the induction of aromatase expression in astrocytes following penetrative brain injury in the zebra finch.

Disorders

Aromatase excess syndrome 

A number of investigators have reported on a rather rare syndrome of excess aromatase activity. In boys, it creates gynecomastia, and in girls, precocious puberty and gigantomastia. In both sexes, early epiphyseal closure leads to short stature. This condition is due to mutations in the CYP19A1 gene which encodes aromatase. It is inherited in an autosomal dominant fashion. It has been suggested that the pharaoh Akhenaten and other members of his family may have suffered from this disorder, but more recent genetic tests suggest otherwise. It is one of the causes of familial precocious puberty—a condition first described in 1937.

Aromatase deficiency syndrome 

This syndrome is due to a mutation of gene CYP19 and inherited in an autosomal recessive way. Accumulations of androgens during pregnancy may lead to virilization of a female at birth (males are not affected). Females will have primary amenorrhea. Individuals of both sexes will be tall, as lack of estrogen does not bring the epiphyseal lines to closure.

Inhibition of aromatase 
The inhibition of aromatase can cause hypoestrogenism (low estrogen levels).  The following natural products have been found to have inhibiting effects on aromatase.

 Apigenin
 Catechin
 Chalcones
 Eriodictyol
 Hesperetin
 Isoliquiritigenin
 Mangostin
 Myosmine
 Nicotine
 Resveratrol
 Vitamin E
 Zinc

Extracts of certain (white button variety: Agaricus bisporus) mushrooms have been shown to inhibit aromatase in vitro.

Pharmaceutical aromatase inhibitors 

Aromatase inhibitors, which stop the production of estrogen in postmenopausal women, have become useful in the management of patients with breast cancer whose lesion was found to be estrogen receptor positive. Inhibitors that are in current clinical use include anastrozole, exemestane, and letrozole. Aromatase inhibitors are also beginning to be prescribed to men on testosterone replacement therapy as a way to keep estrogen levels from spiking once doses of testosterone are introduced to their systems.

See also 
 Steroidogenic enzyme

References

Further reading

External links 
 "U.S. study of gay sheep may shed light on sexuality", via WikiNews, 15 August 2005.
 
 

EC 1.14.14
19